Summerseat railway station is a preserved railway station that serves the village of Summerseat in Greater Manchester, England.  It is part of the preserved East Lancashire Railway (which runs for 12 miles from Heywood-Rawtenstall).

Services

References

External links 
 Summerseat Views is a resident's blog which aims to provide a photographic diary of life and the seasons in the village.

Heritage railway stations in the Metropolitan Borough of Bury
Former Lancashire and Yorkshire Railway stations
Railway stations in Great Britain opened in 1846
Railway stations in Great Britain closed in 1972
Railway stations in Great Britain opened in 1987
Beeching closures in England